Edo Ophof (born 21 May 1959) is a Dutch former footballer who played as a defender.

During his club career, Ophof played for NEC, Ajax, AZ and Utrecht. He was capped 15 times for the Netherlands national team.

External links
 
 

1959 births
Living people
People from Rhenen
Dutch footballers
Netherlands international footballers
NEC Nijmegen players
AFC Ajax players
AZ Alkmaar players
FC Utrecht players
Eredivisie players
Association football defenders
Footballers from Utrecht (province)